Ignacio 'Nacho' María González Gatti (born 14 May 1982) is a Uruguayan professional footballer who plays for Montevideo Wanderers F.C. as a midfielder.

Club career
Born in Montevideo, González's professional career began at Danubio FC, where he appeared in a total of 170 games whilst scoring more than 50 official goals for the capital-based club. During his spell, he won the Primera División title twice, in 2004 and 2007.

After his performances for Danubio, González eventually moved to France with AS Monaco FC in January 2008, being scarcely used during his six-month loan spell. On 27 April, he scored in a 2–3 Ligue 1 home loss against Olympique de Marseille.

González was then bought by Valencia CF of La Liga. However, on 1 September 2008, he joined Newcastle United on loan until the end of the season; this move was the final straw for Newcastle's manager Kevin Keegan, who claimed he was forced to sign the player by executive director Dennis Wise after only seeing him play on YouTube, and believing González was not good enough for the team.

González picked up a serious achilles tendon injury early into the campaign, ruling him out of action for four months. In February 2009, coach Chris Hughton was quoted on the Magpies' official website as saying that González was recovering well, and was certain he would feature again for them. However, he did not, and returned to the Che in July 2009. A Premier League tribunal confirmed in October that the loan signing had been against manager Keegan's wishes, and was in breach of his contract, resulting in a compensation payout to the manager. The deal was reportedly done by Wise and Mike Ashley as a "favour" for two South American agents.

After not having appeared once during 2009–10, González was loaned to Levadiakos FC until the end of the 2009–10 Greek Superleague season. He then returned to Spain, signing on loan with Levante UD, newly promoted to La Liga for 2010–11. He ruptured cruciate knee ligaments playing against Real Madrid in his third match for the club, did not appear again, and returned to Valencia in the following transfer window.

In late July 2011, González cut ties with Valencia and joined Standard Liège of the Belgian Pro League.

International career
González made his debut for Uruguay in a 1–2 defeat to England on 1 March 2006, coming on as a late substitute at Anfield. Subsequently, he was part of the 2007 Copa América squad which finished fourth: in the semi-final against Brazil, he was brought on at half-time as the nation fought back to 2–2 to take the game into extra time; he then scored in the penalty shootout, but his team was eliminated.

González scored his first international goal in a 3–1 friendly win over Japan on 20 August 2008, at the Sapporo Dome. He was picked for the squad, which appeared at the 2010 FIFA World Cup, playing 63 minutes of the group stage opener against France (0–0 draw) as the Charrúas reached the last-four stage.

International goals

Personal life
González is a devout and practicing Catholic.

Honours
Danubio
Uruguayan Primera División: 2004, 2006–07

References

External links

National team data 

1982 births
Living people
Footballers from Montevideo
Uruguayan footballers
Association football midfielders
Uruguayan Primera División players
Danubio F.C. players
Club Nacional de Football players
Montevideo Wanderers F.C. players
Ligue 1 players
AS Monaco FC players
La Liga players
Segunda División players
Valencia CF players
Levante UD footballers
Hércules CF players
Premier League players
Newcastle United F.C. players
Super League Greece players
Levadiakos F.C. players
Belgian Pro League players
Standard Liège players
Uruguay international footballers
2007 Copa América players
2010 FIFA World Cup players
Uruguayan expatriate footballers
Expatriate footballers in Monaco
Expatriate footballers in Spain
Expatriate footballers in England
Expatriate footballers in Greece
Expatriate footballers in Belgium
Uruguayan expatriate sportspeople in Monaco
Uruguayan expatriate sportspeople in Spain
Uruguayan expatriate sportspeople in England
Uruguayan expatriate sportspeople in Greece
Uruguayan expatriate sportspeople in Belgium
Opus Dei members
Uruguayan Roman Catholics